The Herreshoff Prudence, also called the Herreshoff Prudence 23, is an American trailerable sailboat that was designed by L. Francis Herreshoff as a cruiser and first built in 1937. It was L. Francis Herreshoff's design number 71 and named for Prudence Island.

Production
Plans were published in The Rudder magazine in about 1938 and the design has been built by a number of companies since then. The last known builder was Middleton Marine in La Crosse, Florida, United States. That company started production in the 1980s and was still building boats in the early 21st century, but is now inactive and the boat is now out of production. When it was in production, Middleton Marine supplied the boat on a custom basis as a kit at various different levels of completion, or as a ready-to-sail boat.

Design
The Herreshoff Prudence is a recreational keelboat, initially built predominantly of wood and later of fiberglass, with wooden trim. It has a masthead sloop rig, a spooned raked stem, an angled transom, a keel-mounted rudder controlled by a tiller and a fixed long keel. It displaces  and carries  of ballast.

The boat is fitted with a Japanese Yanmar 1GMF diesel engine for docking and maneuvering.

The design has sleeping accommodation for two people, on two straight settee berths in the main cabin. The galley is located on both sides amidships. The galley is equipped with a two-burner stove, an icebox and a sink. The head is located centered in the forepeak.

Operational history
In a 2010 review Steve Henkel wrote, "best features: The traditionalist will enjoy the design, originated in 1937 ... As with any of her comp[etitor]s, the Prudence will satisfy the cruiser's need to explore distant places in relative comfort regardless of weather (short of a gale). Worst features: The headroom falls short of her comp[etitor]s by 14" or more—but if the galley were moved aft under the companionway, a dodger could be installed to provide reasonable standing headroom at the galley while preparing meals."

See also
List of sailing boat types

References

External links
Photo of a Herreshoff Prudence, with a bowspit fitted

Keelboats
1930s sailboat type designs
Sailing yachts
Trailer sailers
Sailboat type designs by L. Francis Herreshoff
Sailboat types built by Middleton Marine